Call Me Up is the 2009 debut album by Chicago band Cains & Abels. This album was released by States Rights Records in the U.S. In 2011 Positive Beat Recordings issued a vinyl edition with one additional track, "Forty Days and Forty Nights."

Track listing
"Warm Rock" - 2:41
"Call Me Up, Pt. 2" - 4:06
"Never Be Alone" - 5:38
"Killed By Birds" - 4:59
"Metal In My Mouth" - 6:33
"Hard Hearts" - 3:46
"Black Black Black" - 3:22
"Dark Days" - 4:47
"Call Me Up, Pt. 1" - 7:10

Vinyl Only Bonus Track: "Forty Days and Forty Nights"

References

2009 debut albums
Cains & Abels albums